John Tavares (born September 4, 1968, in Toronto, Ontario) is a Canadian former professional box lacrosse player and current head coach of the Buffalo Bandits of the National Lacrosse League (NLL). He is the NLL's all-time leading scorer and also a mathematics teacher at Philip Pocock Catholic Secondary School in Mississauga, Ontario, Canada. He attended D'Youville College in Buffalo, New York.

Tavares played his entire National Lacrosse League (NLL) career with the Buffalo Bandits, starting in their inaugural season in 1992. He was acquired from the Detroit Turbos in exchange for Brian Nikula in October 1991. Tavares was also the Professional Lacrosse Players' Association representative for the Bandits.

Tavares is the NLL's all-time leader in games played (306), goals (815), assists (934), and points (1,749). His 2,191 loose balls recovered is the second most all-time.

Tavares is the uncle of John Tavares, the captain and star forward of the Toronto Maple Leafs.

John Tavares was inducted into Canada's Sports Hall of Fame on May 12, 2022.

National Lacrosse League

On Saturday February 18, 2006, the Buffalo Bandits defeated the Minnesota Swarm by a score of 14–9 in front of 12,458 fans at HSBC Arena in Buffalo, New York.  In that game, John Tavares tied the NLL Career Points (goals + assists) record at 1,091 points held by Gary Gait, who had retired after the 2005 season.

On Saturday March 4, 2006, 10,961 fans witnessed history. On that night, the Buffalo Bandits played their 7th regular season game again hosting the Minnesota Swarm, and Tavares scored two points in an 11–8 loss.  The first was his 1,092nd career point, the record-breaker, which was an assist to Mark Steenhuis who scored a power-play goal at 11:57 in the second period.  (The second point, Point 1,093, was also an assist to Steenhuis in the third period.)  Play was stopped, and Tavares was given the game ball.

On Saturday January 20, 2008, Tavares scored his 597th career goal (against goalie Matt Vinc) in a win over the New York Titans, passing Gary Gait and becoming the NLL's all-time leader in goals scored. May 17, 2008 Tavares won his fourth championship and first since 1996. The Bandits beat the Portland Lumberjax in the championship game with the help of two Tavares goals.

During the 2009 NLL season, he was named to the All-Star Game.

Career totals including playoffs
 Games Played: 344
 Career Goals: 899
 Career Assists: 1,050
 Career Points: 1,949
 Loose Balls: 2,464 	
 Tavares was the first player in NLL history to have 500 goals and 500 assists.

Points milestones
 No. 1: Jan. 4, 1992, assist to Rich Kilgour vs. New York in first game.
 100: March 20, 1993, goal vs. Detroit's Paul Mootz in 16th game.
 200: Jan. 20, 1996, goal vs. Baltimore's J.J. Pearl in 34th game.
 300: Feb. 7, 1997, assist to Darris Kilgour vs. Baltimore in 47th game.
 400: Jan. 8, 1999, goal vs. Philadelphia's Dallas Eliuk in 62nd game.
 500: Feb. 18, 2000, goal vs. Rochester's Pat O'Toole in 78th game.
 600: Feb. 10, 2001, goal vs. Washington's Devin Dalep in 91st game.
 700: Feb. 1, 2002, assist to Chris Driscoll vs. Montreal in 107th game.
 800: Feb. 8, 2003, assist to Mike Accursi vs. Toronto in 122nd game.
 900: Feb. 14, 2004, goal vs. Anaheim's Matt Disher in 139th game.
 1,000: Feb. 19, 2005, assist to Delby Powless vs. Rochester in 154th game.
 1,091: Feb. 18, 2006, assist to Cory Bomberry vs. Minnesota in 169th game. (Ties Gary Gait's then-existing NLL Career Points Record)
 1,092: March 4, 2006, assist to Mark Steenhuis vs. Minnesota in 170th game. (New NLL Career Points Record)
 1,600: March 17, 2012, goal vs. Minnesota in 259th game.
 1,949: May 8, 2015, assist to Dhane Smith vs. Rochester in (Division Semifinal) game 349. (final tally)

Statistics
Reference:

Canadian Lacrosse Association

Tavares' teams have won seven Mann Cups, 1992 and 1993 with the Brampton Excelsiors, 1994 through 1996 with the Six Nations Chiefs, 2002 with the Victoria Shamrocks, and 2012 with the Peterborough Lakers. In 1992, 1993, and 1996, Tavares won the Mike Kelley Memorial Trophy as most valuable player in the Mann Cup competition. Tavares also won the Major Series Lacrosse scoring title eight times, and the MSL's Most Valuable Player award three times. Tavares played Ontario Junior A lacrosse for the Mississauga Tomahawks.

Statistics

International play
 

John Tavares represented Canada internationally. He played for his home country in the 2003 and in the 2007 World Championships, winning the gold medal in both.

See also
 NLL records

References

Further reading

External links
 JOHN TAVARES NAMED TO 2012 NLL ALL-PRO TEAM (from 2012)
 TAVARES LOOKS BACK ON ANOTHER SUCCESSFUL SEASON (from 2011)
 Professional Lacrosse Players Association John Tavares Interview (from 1999)

1968 births
Buffalo Bandits players
Canadian lacrosse players
Canadian people of Portuguese descent
Lacrosse people from Ontario
Living people
National Lacrosse League All-Stars
National Lacrosse League major award winners
Sportspeople from Toronto
D'Youville College alumni
Canadian expatriate sportspeople in the United States
Buffalo Bandits coaches